Robert Appleby (died 1407), of Lincoln, was an English burgess.

He was elected Mayor of Lincoln for 1402–03 and a Member (MP) of the Parliament of England for Lincoln in the parliaments assembled in January 1397 and October 1404.

References

14th-century births
1407 deaths
English MPs January 1397
English MPs October 1404
Members of the Parliament of England (pre-1707) for Lincoln
Mayors of Lincoln, England